The 8th Secretariat of the Communist Party of Cuba (PCC) was elected in 2021 by the 1st Plenary Session of the 8th Central Committee in the immediate aftermath of the 8th Party Congress.

Officers

Members

References

Specific

Bibliography
Articles and journals:
 

 
2021 establishments in Cuba
Secretariat